Clackmannan County might refer to:

Clackmannan County Association F.C., an 1879 association football club in Alloa, Scotland; often mistakenly associated with Alloa Athletic F.C.
County of Clackmannan, Scotland